(stylized as TEPPƎN) is a free-to-play digital collectible card game developed by GungHo Online Entertainment and Capcom. It released in North America and Europe on July 4, 2019 and in Asia on August 8 for Android, and iOS. The game was initially known as Project Battle and is a crossover video game between multiple Capcom franchises.

Gameplay 
Teppen is a 1v1 video game where both players start the match with five playing cards in their hands randomly selected from their card deck, 30 health points and four mana. A mulligan system allows players to switch their five starting cards into another set of five randomly drawn cards.

Players acquire mana automatically as the match progresses, and are forced to use it in order to play cards. Any mana used will be turned in "Art Points" which is used to perform a Hero Art. The cards are split into two major categories in the game, being "Action Cards" and "Unit Cards".  Unit Cards are those which can only be placed on the field with an attack line that will eventually reach the opponent and deal damage, the attack line of the Unit Cards push forward in real-time. Action Cards on the other hands are special cards which will trigger a special phase named "Active Response".

The Active Response will pause the real-time gameplay and switches it into turn-based. Players will now have a small timer to react back with another Action Card or choose for the Active Response to end. Once the latter is done, the Action Card order is played from a reverse order, this allows players to deny potential plays from the opponent.

Once players have used enough cards, the Art Points will reach a point where a Hero Art can be performed. Hero Arts are a special move in the game which plays a short cinematic of the hero in question and pauses the game entirely. Players may use the Hero Art to sabotage the opponent in a way which they perform the move shortly before an attack line reaches the opponent's side, making it difficult for the other player to block the attack. The Action Card with its Active Response mechanic may also be used this way.

Once a player reaches zero health, the match is over and they will lose. As Teppen matches have a time limit of five minutes, whichever player has the least amount of health at the end will also lose the match. There are no ties in the game, in the event of both players dealing a final blow to one another at the same time or the five minute timer ending with both players at the same amount of health, a "Double Defeat" will happen instead.

Playable characters 
The playable characters are referred to as "heroes". The first eight were released at launch, while the rest are later released commonly alongside a major expansion. All heroes are unlocked by default and can be played at no additional fee, the only exception to this is Phoenix Wright and Nina, both are "skins" for Chun-Li and Jill Valentine respectively, as such, they both act the same way as the two original heroes would during gameplay.

Expansion List

Esports 
Teppen World Championship is an official esports event organized by GungHo Online Entertainment. The finals of the 2019 championship was held at the Tokyo International Forum on December 21, 2019 with a prize pool of 50,000,000 Japanese yen total. Its 2020 championship was held online due to the COVID-19 pandemic, the prize pool was 5,000,000 Japanese yen.

The Teppen World Championship Series 2021 took place throughout 2021. Seven different small tournaments took place for seven different months of that year. The total prize pool was 1,000,000 Japanese yen for each individual tournament. The tournaments were sponsored by ZONe, Meiji Dairies, BookLive, 桃屋 (Momoya), UNO, BS11 and Hyperice.

Currently, the Teppen World Championship Series 2022 is being organized with a prize pool of 1,000,000 yen for the finals and an additional 100,000 yen for its second tournament for those placed between 33rd to 64th place in the qualifiers.

Notes

References

External links 
 

2019 video games
Android (operating system) games
Capcom games
Digital collectible card games
IOS games
Video games developed in Japan
Crossover video games